The World Council of Comparative Education Societies (WCCES) is an international organization of comparative education societies created in 1970 in Ottawa, Canada. It is organized as an NGO in operational relations with UNESCO. The current president is N‘Dri Thérèse Assié-Lumumba.

History
The WCCES was founded in 1970 in Ottawa, Canada, by the Comparative and International Education Society (CIES). The founding members include comparative education pioneers Leo Fernig (International Bureau of Education), Gerald Read (CIES) and Joe Katz (Comparative and International Education Society of Canada)(CIESC). They were greatly influenced by the spread of national, regional and language-based comparative and international education societies during the 1960s and founded the WCCES to unite the societies that existed at the time: the CIES, the CIESC, the Comparative Education Society in Europe (CESE), the Japan Comparative Education Society (JCES) and the Korean Comparative Education Society (KCES). With the purpose of spreading comparative education globally, the WCCES has gained 41 national, regional and language-based member societies as of 2021.

Governance and operation
Although the WCCES is open to all eligible societies, it mainly serves the academic community. The organization supports research programs that concern globalization, theory and methods in comparative education and gender equality and equity in education, among other topics. Through its recruitment efforts, the WCCES has been able to facilitate the formation of new member societies and maintain existing ones that were nearly defunct.

The WCCES regularly holds a World Congress, where individuals representing member societies convene in a general assembly. The general assembly shares updates on the WCCES work that has transpired in the years since it last convened and engages in decision-making when necessary. The WCCES Executive Committee—the president, two vice presidents, secretary general, treasurer and member society representatives—and chairpersons convene at least annually to govern the organization.

The WCCES Executive Committee has planned to hold World Congresses in various regions of the world to stimulate comparative education activity where they are held. Due to the limited funding the WCCES receives, the Executive Committee meetings are usually held during World Congresses and in conjunction with large comparative
education society conferences, namely those of the CIES in the U.S. and the CESE in Europe.

Media
The WCCES circulates two publications, Bulletin in Innovation and CERCular, to keep member societies informed of global activities.

Bias
Historically, the WCCES has mainly operated its affairs and online presence in English, due to the relatively few resources the Executive Committee has had compared to better-resourced organizations such as UNESCO.

Because attendance at WCCES meetings is self-funded by member society representatives, equitable representation has been a concern. The Executive Committee has responded to the issue by holding World Congresses at the widely-attended CIES and CESE conferences. Additionally, in 2005, the committee held its meeting at the home of an Asian regional society for the first time. The meeting in Malaysia was held in conjunction with the Comparative Education Society of Asia's (CESA) biennial conference. The Executive Committee repeated the effort in 2007, when they met in Hong Kong during the combined CESA and Comparative Education Society of Hong Kong (CESHK) conference.

Conferences

Member societies
The WCCES member societies include the following:
 Asociación de Pedagogos de Cuba (Sección de Educación Comparada) (APC-SEC)
 Association Française pour le Développement de I'Éducation Comparée et des Échanges (AFDECE)
 Association Francophone d’Éducation Comparée (AFEC)
 Australian and New Zealand Comparative and International Education Society (ANZCIES)
 British Association for International and Comparative Education (BAICE)
 Bulgarian Comparative Education Society (BCES)
 China Comparative Education Society (CCES)
 Chinese Comparative Education Society - Taipei (CCES-T)
 Comparative Education Society of Asia (CESA)
 Comparative Education Society in Europe (CESE)
 Comparative Education Society of Hong Kong (CESHK)
 Comparative Education Society of India (CESI)
 Comparative Education Society of the Philippines (CESP)
 Comparative and International Education Society (CIES)
 Comparative and International Education Society of Canada (CIESC)
 Council on Comparative Education of Kazakhstan (CCEK)
 Czech Pedagogical Society (Comparative Education Section) (CPS-CES)
 Egyptian Comparative Education & Educational Administration Society (ECEEAS)
 Greek Comparative Education Society (GCES)
 Hungarian Pedagogic Society (Comparative Education Section) (HPS-CES)
 Israel Comparative Education Society (ICES)
 Japan Comparative Education Society (JCES)
 Korean Comparative Education Society (KCES)
 Mediterranean Society of Comparative Education (MESCE)
 Nederlandstalig Genootschap voor Vergelijkende Studie van Opvoeding en Onderwijs (NGVO)
 Nordic Comparative and International Education Society (NOCIES)
 Polish Comparative Education Society (PCES)
 Russian Council of Comparative Education (RCCE)
 Sektion International und Interkulturell Vergleichende Erziehungswissenschaft in der Deutschen Gesellschaft für Erziehungswissenschaft (SIIVEDGE)
 Sezione Italiana della CESE (SICESE)
 Sociedad Argentina de Estudios Comparados en Educación (SAECE)
 Sociedad Española de Educación Comparada (SEEC)
 Sociedad Mexicana de Educación Comparada (SOMEC)
 Sociedade Brasileira de Educação Comparada (SBEC)
 Southern African Comparative and History of Education Society (SACHES)
 Turkish Comparative Education Society (TUCES)

References

External links
 Homepage

International educational organizations
Learned societies